Hörby (old ) is a locality and the seat of Hörby Municipality, Skåne County, Sweden with 15 631 inhabitants in 2019.

6 km (3.7 mi) south-east of the center of Hörby is at least since 1959 the location of a radio and TV transmitter. Short wave antennas have been dismantled there in 2011.

Climate
Hörby has a transitional maritime-continental climate with moderate seasonal swings by Nordic inland standards. The weather station was opened in 1995 and thus cold records are limited, but nearby Stehag recorded  in February 1979. With a January mean just below freezing, Hörby is as of 2021, the southernmost station in Sweden to average a meteorological winter under Nordic definitions of  means. Its inland and somewhat elevated location means higher levels of precipitation than in many surrounding areas, common to southern Sweden. As such, heavy snowfall sometimes occur during winter and the more frequent cloud cover in summer renders Hörby quite a bit milder than lower areas around Öresund and Österlen during the warm season.

References 

Populated places in Hörby Municipality
Municipal seats of Skåne County
Swedish municipal seats
Populated places in Skåne County